Podocarpus ridleyi is a species of conifer in the family Podocarpaceae. It is found only in Malaysia.

References

ridleyi
Least concern plants
Taxonomy articles created by Polbot